In military terms, 117th Division or 117th Infantry Division may refer to:

 Infantry divisions 

 117th Division (People's Republic of China)
 117th Infantry Division (German Empire)
 117th Division (Imperial Japanese Army)
 117th Rifle Division (Soviet Union)

sl:Seznam divizij po zaporednih številkah (100. - 149.)#117. divizija